Ai He may refer to
 Ai He or Love River, a river (canal) in southern Taiwan
 Ai He (Yalu), a tributary of Yalu River in Liaoning province, China